Edgar Le Bastard was a French industrialist and politician in the nineteenth century. He was mayor of Rennes from 1880 until his death in 1892 and senator of Ille-et-Vilaine from 1879 to 1888.

References

1892 deaths
Senators of Ille-et-Vilaine